Santa María Magdalena (St Mary Magdalene) is one of a number of medieval Roman Catholic churches in Tudela, region of Navarre, Spain.	
It is a Romanesque style building.

History
When Alfonso the Battler conquered Tudela in 1129 there was already a Mozarabic community in the city.

The church was erected in the second half of the 12th century, perhaps on the site of a Mozarabic church. The sculpted portal is elaborately decorated with biblical scenes and those of daily life. The bell-tower is also Romanesque with a series of rounded arches. The interior has a 16th-century gilded retablo dedicated to Mary Magdalen. The chapels were built during the 16th and 17th centuries.

Conservation
The church was made a Bien de Interés Cultural in 1983.

References

External links

Churches in Navarre
Romanesque architecture in Navarre
12th-century Roman Catholic church buildings in Spain